The 2014–15 Samoa National League was the 25th edition of the Samoa National League, the top league of the Football Federation Samoa. This season was won by Lupe o le Soaga for the second recorded time.

Standings

References 

Samoa National League seasons
Samoa
football
Samoa
football